Aynajik (also Romanized as ‘Aynajīk, Ainajek, ‘Eynajīk, ‘Eynejīk, and Eynjik; also known as Aynadzhek and Enjag) is a village in Karasf Rural District, in the Central District of Khodabandeh County, Zanjan Province, Iran. At the 2006 census, its population was 818, in 192 families.

References 

Populated places in Khodabandeh County